Djurgårdens IF (formerly Djurgården/Älvsjö (2003–2007)) is a football club from Stockholm, the capital of Sweden. The team play their home games on Stockholm Olympic Stadium The team colours are white and blue. The club is affiliated to Stockholms Fotbollförbund.

History

Start 
During the 1960s, a women's team representing Djurgårdens IF under the lead of Gösta Sandberg met Öxabäcks IF and won 2–1. In 1969, Djurgården participated in Stockholms FF:s försöksserie with IFK Bagarmossen, IK Göta, Gröndals IK, Örby IS, IK Tellus, Tyresö IF, and Vällingby AIK, which Djurgården won without any losses. In 1984 the team was promoted to the then top-tier Division 1 Norra for the first time. 1985, the debut season in the top-tier ended with a fifth place in the league consisting of AIK, Bälinge IF, Gideonsbergs IF, Hammarby IF, Ope IF, Rönninge SK, Strömsbro IF, Sundsvalls DFF, Sunnanå SK.

In 1988, Djurgården reached Damallsvenskan for the first time by finishing first in Division 1 Norra. In the 1989 season, Djurgården finished fourth in Damallsvenskan and played play-off semifinals, which they lost on away goals (1–1) to Jitex BK.

After finishing second in the 1991 Damallsvenskan, Djurgården lost again to Jitex BK in the semi-finals of the play-off. The season after, Djurgården got relegated after finishing 11th in Damallsvenskan. Djurgården again won promotion to Damallsvenskan in the 1996 season.

Djurgården/Älvsjö merger 
In 2003, Djurgårdens IF and five-time Swedish champions Älvsjö AIK merged to form Djurgården/Älvsjö, where Djurgården owned 51 percent and Älvsjö AIK 49 percent. The new team consisted of a mix of Djurgården and Älvsjö players, including Swedish footballers Victoria Svensson, Elin Flyborg, Linda Fagerström, Ulrika Björn, and Jane Törnqvist and coached by Thomas Dennerby.

Djurgården/Älvsjö won Damallsvenskan in their first year with a team consisting of Jill Buchwald, Katarina Wicksell, Jane Törnqvist, Therese Brogårde, Jenny Curtsdotter, Helene Nordin, Helen Fagerström, Nadja Gyllander, Sara Thunebro, Josefine Christensen, Ann-Marie Norlin, Malin Nykvist, Linda Fagerström, Tina Kindvall, Jennie Jonsson, Annica Svensson, Linda Nöjd, Victoria Svensson, Elin Flyborg, Sara Johansson, Ulrika Björn, and Jessica Landström.

Djurgården/Älvsjö won Damallsvenskan again in 2004. The team consisted of Maja Åström, Jill Buchwald, Katarina Wicksell, Jane Törnqvist, Therese Brogårde, Jenny Curtsdotter, Helen Fagerström, Nadja Gyllander, Sara Thunebro, Kristin Bengtsson, Emma Liljegren, Ann-Marie Norlin, Malin Nykvist, Linda Fagerström, Jennie Jonsson, Anna Hall, Annica Svensson, Ingrid Bohlin, Marijke Callebaut, Victoria Svensson, Sara Johansson, Venus James, and Jessica Landström.

During the 2004–05 season, the team were runners up in the UEFA Women's Cup after having lost the final against 1. FFC Turbine Potsdam

From the 2007 season, the team competed as Djurgårdens IF. In 2007, the team signed German goalkeeper Nadine Angerer to replace their retiring keeper Bente Nordby.

Elitettan (2012–15)
In the 2012 Damallsvenskan season, Djurgården finished eleventh and was relegated to Elitettan. In the late 2013, Djurgårdens IF Dam joined the men's football section of Djurgårdens IF Fotboll form having been their own section.

In October 2015, Djurgårdens IF secured a promotion place to the 2016 Damallsvenskan.

Stadium

Djurgårdens IF play their home games on Stockholm Olympic Stadium. They have also played their matches as Hjorthagens IP, Älvsjö IP, Kristinebergs IP and Östermalms IP.

Current squad

Former players

Managers

 Gösta Sandberg (1968)
 Claes Bergwall (1969–71)
 Rolf Björk (1972)
 Lasse Björkman (1972)
 Lasse Björkman, Gustav Johansson and Bengt Ståhl (1973)
 Bengt Ståhl (1974)
 Otto Wahlström (1975–76)
 Lars-Magnus Wester (1977–78)
 Marko Tomljenovic and Olle Gustavsson (1979)
 Ulla Bjerkhaug and Olle Gustavsson (1979)
 Ulf Lyfors and Olle Gustavsson (1979)
 Ulf Lyfors and Ulla Bjerkhaug (1980)
 Lennart Ljungqvist (1981–82)
 Jörgen Lindman (1983)
 Kenneth Hedlund (1984–1985)
 Karl-Axel Flygar (1986)
 Peter Carlsson (1987)
 Jörgen Lindman (1988)
 Gordon Rönnberg (1989–91)
 Jan Byheden (1992)
 Ulf Mattsson (1993–94)
 Lennart Ljungqvist and Lennart Bergquist (1995–96)
 Stefan Linder (1997–99)
 Tomas Folkesson (2000)
 Håkan Andersson and Tomas Folkesson (2001)
 Mikael Söderman (2002)
 Thomas Dennerby (2003–04)
 Mikael Söderman (2005)
 Benny Persson (2005–07)
 Anders Johansson (2008–09)
 Daniel Kalles Pettersson (2010)
 Patrik Eklöf (2011–12)
 Marcelo Fernández (2013)
 Carl-Åke Larsen (2014)
 Mauri Holappa (2015)
 Yvonne Ekroth (2016)
 Joel Riddez (2017–2019)
 Pierre Fondin (2019–2021)
 Magnus Pålsson (2021–present)

Honours

Domestic

League
 Damallsvenskan:
 Champions (2): 2003, 2004
Runner-up (3): 1991, 2006, 2007
 Division 1 Norra:
 Winners (2): 1988, 1996
Runner-up (1): 1995
 Elitettan:
Runner-up (1): 2015

Cup
Svenska Cupen:
Champions (3): 1999–2000, 2004, 2005
Runner-up (3): 1998–99, 2001, 2010

European
 UEFA Women's Cup/UEFA Women's Champions League:
Runner-up (1): 2005

Record in UEFA competitions
All results (away, home and aggregate) list Djurgården Stockholm's goal tally first.

a First leg.

Records 
 Highest attendance: 6,068 vs. Umeå IK (2003)

References

External links

 Djurgårdens IF Dam – Official website 

 
Women's football clubs in Sweden
Football clubs in Stockholm
Fotboll dam
Association football clubs established in 2003
2003 establishments in Sweden